Temple Run is a video game franchise of 3D endless running video games developed and published by Imangi Studios. The primary theme of the series is an explorer chased from a group of demon monkeys, however, the characters and theme vary between spin-offs. The game was initially released for iOS devices on August 4, 2011, and later ported to Android systems and Windows Phone 8. The series consists of five titles and has received commercial success with multiple entries surpassing 1 million downloads.

Gameplay
In the Temple Run series, the player controls a player character with the perspective behind the player character's back. While the character is running, the player can swipe left or right to move the character to either side of the screen to collect coins and avoid obstacles. The player can also swipe down to slide down towards the ground or swipe up to jump. If the path leads to a turn, the player must swipe toward the direction of the turn to successfully stay on the path. Intersections on the path allow the player to choose different paths. If the player does not avoid obstacles or doesn't turn to stay on the path, the player will fall off the path or die and lose.  Throughout the path, there are coins to collect. There are three types of coins to be found while the character is running: gold, red, and blue. A gold coin will only add one coin to the player's total number of coins. Red coins are worth two coins, while blue coins are worth three. The coins can be used to buy and then upgrade power-ups and/or other characters. Coins can also be bought by the player through in-app purchases with payments of actual money. When the player needs to turn left or right, the touchscreen can be swiped in the corresponding direction. If the player wishes to jump over an object, the screen can be swiped upwards; if the player wishes to slide under an object, the screen can be swiped downwards.

Games

Released

Temple Run
The first entry in the Temple Run series.

Temple Run: Brave
In June 2012, it was announced that Imangi had teamed with Disney/Pixar to promote the 2012 animated film Brave via a Temple Run-style game titled Temple Run: Brave. The game was released on June 14 for iOS and Android. As with Temple Run when it was initially released, Temple Run: Brave cost 99 cents to purchase. Temple Run: Brave is set in the highlands of Scotland. The characters are King Fergus and Princess Merida, and as in the original game, the objective is to keep running, avoiding the dangers along the way in an effort to achieve the longest time possible, while being chased by the demon black bear, Mor'du.

The new feature for Temple Run: Brave is archery. During the run, archery symbols appear with some dots above them, acting as a signal that there will be bullseyes at which to shoot. The dots are the number of targets in the area. On the left and right sides, the player will then find archery targets, and by touching the screen, an arrow is shot accurately at the upcoming target. When the player finishes hitting all targets in the area, they  get a coin bonus, and must then wait for another area with archery targets.

In an update, Temple Run: Brave received a new power-up, the "Will-o'-the-Wisps", which appear in the game random times during gameplay. When the player obtains it, they are transported to a "dark" version of the game world, where glowing wisps appear in the player's path. The player has to grab as many as they can, while still navigating the turns and jumps.

In 2013, Temple Run: Brave was ported to Windows Phone 8, and both Windows 8 and Windows RT (via Windows Store). In 2014, it was ported to BlackBerry 10.

Temple Run 2
Direct sequel to the first Temple Run game.

Temple Run: Oz
A second spinoff game, called Temple Run: Oz, based on the Disney film Oz the Great and Powerful, was released on February 27, 2013, for iOS, to coincide with the release of the film. On August 28, 2013, Temple Run: Oz was released for Windows Phone 8.

Temple Run VR
Temple Run VR was announced in September 2014 for the Samsung Gear VR headset and released on December 23, 2014. This version the player is being chased by an arctic demon monkey in first person perspective. Players must avoid snow and jump over cliffs in order to survive. The game was ported to the Oculus Rift on May 1, 2015.

Temple Run: Treasure Hunters 
In late 2016, Scopely soft-launched a match-3 spin-off of Temple Run, titled Temple Run: Treasure Hunters, in select countries.  Treasure Hunters was planned to be released sometime in 2017 on iOS and Android, with the Google Play Store accepting pre-registrations for the Android version.

Reception

Since the initial release of Temple Run on the App Store, the popularity of the game has soared, to the point that Imangi Studios became more popular than Zynga. In the iTunes Store, the game was included in the top 50 most-downloaded apps in December 2011, and eventually became the number one free iOS app in the Store. It also reached the position of the top grossing iOS app. The Android version was downloaded one million times in under three days of its released. After Temple Run: Braves release on the App Store, the game topped the charts as the most-downloaded paid game.

Within four days of Temple Run 2'''s iOS release, the game had reached twenty million downloads, six million of which were within the first twenty-four hours. As of June 2014, Temple Run'' and its sequel have been downloaded over 1 billion times.

References

Android (operating system) games
IOS games
Video games developed in the United States
Windows Phone games
Endless runner games
Single-player video games
Indie video games
2010s fads and trends